Chapelle Russell (born January 20, 1997) is an American football linebacker for the Pittsburgh Steelers of the National Football League (NFL). He played college football at Temple.

College career
Russell verbally committed to Temple during his senior year at Lakewood High School. He endured ACL surgery during his redshirt freshman year at Temple but was named Temple's Male Comeback Player of the Year in 2018. In 2019, Russell recorded 72 tackles (47 solo) with nine tackles for loss and three pass breakups. In his Temple career, he played 45 games over a four-year career and recorded 237 tackles, 19.5 tackles for loss, three sacks, nine pass breakups, three forced fumbles, and six fumble recoveries. At the 2020 NFL Scouting Combine in Indianapolis, Russell ran the 40-yard dash in 4.69 seconds, did 21 reps of 225 pounds in the bench press, and recorded a 35-inch vertical leap.

Professional career

Tampa Bay Buccaneers
Russell was selected by the Tampa Bay Buccaneers in the seventh round with the 241st overall pick in the 2020 NFL Draft. He was waived by the Buccaneers during final roster cuts on September 5, 2020, and was signed to the practice squad the following day. He was promoted to the active roster on October 13, 2020. He was waived on January 8, 2021.

Jacksonville Jaguars
On January 11, 2021, Russell was claimed off waivers by the Jacksonville Jaguars. He was waived on August 29, 2022.

Pittsburgh Steelers
On September 1, 2022, Russell was signed to the Pittsburgh Steelers practice squad. He signed a reserve/future contract on January 12, 2023.

Personal life
During his youth, Russell was part of a family in the US Navy that frequently moved. He was known as Chapelle Cook until changing his last name to Russell to honor his deceased father.

References

External links
Tampa Bay Buccaneers bio
Temple Owls bio

1997 births
Living people
Players of American football from New Jersey
Sportspeople from Lakewood Township, New Jersey
Sportspeople from Ocean County, New Jersey
Lakewood High School (New Jersey) alumni
American football linebackers
Temple Owls football players
Tampa Bay Buccaneers players
Jacksonville Jaguars players
Pittsburgh Steelers players